The Ki Database (or Ki DB) is a public domain database of published binding affinities (Ki) of drugs and chemical compounds for receptors, neurotransmitter transporters, ion channels, and enzymes. The resource is maintained by the University of North Carolina at Chapel Hill and is funded by the NIMH Psychoactive Drug Screening Program and by a gift from the Heffter Research Institute. , the database had data for 7 449 compounds at 738 different receptors and, 6 7696 Ki values.

The Ki database has data useful for both chemical biology and chemogenetics.

External links
Description
Search form
BindingDB.org - A similar publicly available database

Biological databases
Chemical databases
Public domain databases